Dendropsophus minusculus is a species of frog in the family Hylidae.
It is found in Colombia, French Guiana, Guyana, Suriname, Trinidad and Tobago, and Venezuela.
Its natural habitats are subtropical or tropical moist lowland forests, dry savanna, moist savanna, subtropical or tropical seasonally wet or flooded lowland grassland, freshwater marshes, intermittent freshwater marshes, arable land, rural gardens, heavily degraded former forest, and ponds.

References

minusculus
Amphibians of Colombia
Amphibians of French Guiana
Amphibians of Guyana
Amphibians of Suriname
Amphibians of Trinidad and Tobago
Amphibians of Venezuela
Amphibians described in 1971
Taxonomy articles created by Polbot